The Puerto Madero Street Circuit was a street circuit located in Puerto Madero, Buenos Aires. The circuit was designed by Santiago García Remohí. The circuit was the only venue to have featured in the first three seasons, however it did not feature in the fourth season.

References

External links

Sports venues in Buenos Aires
Buenos Aires Puerto Madero
Puerto Madero
Buenos Aires Puerto Madero
Buenos Aires ePrix